The 19th Annual Tony Awards was broadcast on June 13, 1965, from The Astor Hotel in New York City on local television station  WWOR-TV (Channel 9). The Masters of Ceremonies were Tom Bosley, Jose Ferrer, and Van Johnson.

The ceremony
Presenters: George Abbott, Alan Alda, Robert Alda, Alan Arkin, Jean-Pierre Aumont, Sidney Blackmer, Herschel Bernardi, Victor Borge, Gower Champion, Carol Channing, Barbara Cook, Farley Granger, George Grizzard, Sally Ann Howes, Anne Jeffreys, Bert Lahr, Piper Laurie, Bethel Leslie, Ethel Merman, Barry Nelson, Molly Picon, Maureen Stapleton, Jule Styne, Eli Wallach.

Performer: Lucine Amara

Music was by Meyer Davis and his Orchestra.

Award winners and nominees
Winners are in bold

Special awards
Gilbert Miller, for having produced 88 plays and musicals and for his perseverance which has helped to keep New York and theatre alive.
Oliver Smith

Multiple nominations and awards

These productions had multiple nominations:

10 nominations: Fiddler on the Roof   
9 nominations: Half a Sixpence 
6 nominations: The Roar of the Greasepaint – The Smell of the Crowd and Tiny Alice  
5 nominations: Luv, The Odd Couple and The Subject Was Roses  
4 nominations: Baker Street, Golden Boy and Oh, What a Lovely War!
3 nominations: Do I Hear a Waltz?, Slow Dance on the Killing Ground and Tartuffe  
2 nominations: All in Good Time and Bajour 

The following productions received multiple awards.

9 wins: Fiddler on the Roof 
4 wins: The Odd Couple 
3 wins: Luv
2 wins: The Subject Was Roses

External links
Tony Awards official site

Tony Awards ceremonies
1965 in theatre
1965 awards in the United States
June 1965 events in the United States
1965 in New York City